"Peat Bog Soldiers" is one of Europe's best-known protest songs. It exists in countless European languages and became a Republican anthem during the Spanish Civil War. It was a symbol of resistance during the Second World War and is popular with the Peace movement today. It was written, composed and first performed in a Nazi concentration camp by prisoners.

Background

This song was written by prisoners in Nazi moorland labour camps in Lower Saxony, Germany. The Emslandlager ("Emsland camps") – as they were known – were for political opponents of the Third Reich, located outside of Börgermoor, now part of the commune Surwold, not far from Papenburg. A memorial of these camps, the Dokumentations- und Informationszentrum (DIZ) Emslandlager, is located at Papenburg.

In 1933, one camp, Börgermoor, held about 1,000 Socialist and Communist internees. They were banned from singing existing political songs so they wrote and composed their own. The words were written by Johann Esser (a miner) and Wolfgang Langhoff (an actor); the music was composed by Rudi Goguel and was later adapted by Hanns Eisler and Ernst Busch.

It was first performed at a Zircus Konzentrani ("concentration camp circus") on 28 August 1933 at Börgermoor camp. Here is Rudi Goguel's description of it:

The song has a slow simple melody, reflecting a soldier's march, and is deliberately repetitive, echoing and telling of the daily grind of hard labour in harsh conditions. It was popular with German refugees in London in the Thirties and was used as a marching song by the German volunteers of the International Brigades during the Spanish Civil War. It was soon picked up by other nationalities and it appears in almost all the collected anthologies of Spanish Civil War songs.

The French Foreign Legion use the French version of the song, "Le Chant Des Marais", as one of its marching songs, the sombre tone and timing matching the 88 paces per minute distinctive of the Legion.

The "short" (three-verse) lyrics

Langhoff and Esser's original song runs to six verses, plus refrains (see below). For performance – and, therefore, for most translation – shorter lyrics are used. These omit verses two, three and four of the original.

The full version 

This is the full six-verse German version, together with a literal English translation.

References

Further reading
 Hanns Eisler, Bericht über die Entstehung eines Arbeiterliedes, in Musik und Politik,  Schriften 1924–1948 (Ed. Günter Meyer, Munich, 1973, pp. 274–280)
 Wolfgang Langhoff, Die Moorsoldaten. 13 Monate Konzentrationslager (new edition, 1995)
  Le Chant des déportés
  Die Moorsoldaten

Recordings

 Die Moorsoldaten Thirty versions from Emsland Concentration Camp Archive
 broadcast about the Moorsoldaten Lied on Radio Goethe by Arndt Peltner (38'32" mp3, 35MB)
 Paul Robeson – "Songs of Free Men" (1942)
 Erich Kunz – "Erich Kunz sings German University Songs Vol. 4" (1959)
 Ernst Busch – "Spanien 1936–1939"
 Chad Mitchell Trio – "Violets of Dawn" (1966)
 Jamie O'Reilly & Michael Smith – "Pasiones: Songs of the Spanish Civil War 1936–1939"
 Hein & Oss Kröher
 Perry Friedman
 Pi de la Serra
 The Dubliners – "Revolution" (1970)
 Swan Arcade – "Swan Arcade" (1973)
 Theodore Bikel – "From Bondage to Freedom" (1973)
 Hannes Wader – "Hannes Wader singt Arbeiterlieder"
 Welle: Erdball – "Tanzpalast  2000" (1996)
 Laurie Lewis – "Spain in My Heart" (2003)
 Pete Seeger – "Songs of The Spanish Civil War: Vol 1" (2006)
 Luke Kelly – "Working Class Hero" (2008)
 Helium Vola – "Für euch, die ihr liebt" (2009)
 Glengarry Bhoys – "Eight" (2010)
 Die Toten Hosen – "Die Geister die wir riefen" (2012)
 Various – Die Moorsoldaten: EP-CD with four songs (2015)
 Lankum  – "Between the Earth and Sky" (2017)

Footnotes

Songs about soldiers
Songs about the military
Political songs
Protest songs
Songs about revolutions
Works about rebellions
Songs of the Spanish Civil War
German resistance to Nazism
World War II resistance movements
1933 songs
The Dubliners songs